Arup Patnaik (born 8 September 1955) was the 36th Police Commissioner of Mumbai. He is revered as one of the most dynamic and respected IPS officers of the Maharashtra cadre. He retired on 30 September 2015 after a distinguished career in the Maharashtra Police spanning over 36 years in service. He is a recipient of the President's Police Medal for Distinguished Service in 2003 and the Indian Police Medal for meritorious services in 1994. Known  for his integrity and fearlessness, Patnaik is the first and only Odia IPS officer to hold the post of Police Commissioner of Mumbai. 

Arup Patnaik has previously served as the Chairman of Odisha's State Youth Welfare Board, the Biju Yuva Vahini and was accorded the rank and status of Minister of State by the Odisha State Government.

Patnaik started his political journey on April 18, 2018, by being personally inducted into the Biju Janata Dal by the Chief Minister of Odisha, Shri. Naveen Patnaik. 

Arup Patnaik was given the Lok Sabha ticket to contest from Bhubaneswar Lok Sabha constituency for the General Elections, 2019.  

In a close battle which went down to the wire, against BJP Candidate, Bihar born former IAS officer (Odisha Cadre), Aparajita Sarangi, Patnaik lost the Lok Sabha election by a small margin of 19,000 votes (less than 2% of the total votes polled).  

On October 25, 2019 Odisha Chief Minister Naveen Patnaik appointed Arup Patnaik as the Convenor of the Biju Janata Dal social service wing, 'Odisha Mo Parivar.  

On October 30, 2019, Arup Patnaik was inducted as a Co-Opted Member of the House Committee of the Odisha Assembly to look into aspects of Environmental Pollution in the State.   

Arup Patnaik has a natural flair for helping the distressed and the needy, apart from espousing the cause of the underprivileged and during his police career, he also took to helping and assisting Cancer patients, who used to travel to Mumbai for treatment at Tata Memorial Centre. This eventually led to the formation of the Konark Cancer Foundation, a one-stop charitable institution that caters to multifarious requirements of needy cancer patients. Sri Arup Patnaik is the Founder - Managing Trustee of Konark Cancer Foundation, located in Mumbai and having a branch office at Bhubaneswar.

Early life

Patnaik was born on 8 September 1955 in Bhubaneswar, Odisha. He studied up to Class 6th in Cuttack’s Pyarimohan Academy but later attended Mayo College, Ajmer, from where he passed his Indian School Certificate examination in 1971. In-School, he distinguished himself in Boxing and Football.

He is a recipient of The National Science Talent Search Scholarship awarded by the NCERT. He completed his B.Sc. (Chemistry - Hons) from Delhi University.

However, while pursuing his Post Graduate studies in Chemistry, he left halfway to join the State Bank of India as a Probationary Officer in 1976 and worked there till 1979.

Police career

Patnaik joined the I.P.S. in 1979 and was posted as probationary Asst. Supdt. of Police, Nasik (1981-1982). He was subsequently posted as Suptd. of Police Latur from 1983-1986. Patnaik was the first SP of Latur. His stories of taking on the political heavyweights in the region are discussed even after 30 years. Patnaik was then transferred to Nagpur City from 1986-1988. After Nagpur, Patnaik was posted as Supt. of Police, Jalgaon, from 1988-1991. In Mumbai City, he was Deputy Commissioner of Police Zone VII from March 1991 till March 1994. During his eventful tenure, he broke the backbone of the underworld by leading from the front and neutralizing most of the leading shooters from the Dawood, Chota Rajan, and Arun Gawli gangs. He was singled out by the government for his professional and effective handling during the infamous 1992-93 Mumbai Communal Riots. As DCP Zone VII, he was a critical member of the 1993 Bomb Blast team and was also instrumental in the largest ever seizure of RDX, to the tune of 1500 kg at Mumbra in 1993. Patnaik went on deputation to the Central Bureau of Investigation, Govt. of India in March 1994 and was assigned the critical charge of supervising investigations into the multi-crore Harshad Mehta security scam. As D.I.G., C.B.I., he headed the Bank Security & Fraud Cell, a Central Unit of the CBI, which was concerned with the investigation into complicated and Mega Bank scam cases.

Patnaik held the important charge of Additional Commissioner of Police, South Mumbai, during the period 1999-2001 and was assigned to supervise the Police arrangements pertaining to U.S. President, Bill Clinton’s visit to Mumbai.  Critical areas such as Dongri, Nagpada, Byculla, etc. where underworld elements like Dawood Ibrahim, Arun Gawli, etc. had their base and posh areas like Malabar Hill, Marine Drive, Nariman Point, Mantralaya, etc. fell under his charge.

On promotion as Inspector General of Police, he headed State Reserve Police Force (S.R.P.F.) for a record tenure from 2001 to 2005. It was during his tenure in the SRPF, that colors were presented for the first time by the Hon’ble Governor of Maharashtra.  He was also the main architect of the Arms & Ammunition policy for the State of Maharashtra. He was moved back to Mumbai Police Commissionerate as Jt.Commissioner of Police, (Law & Order), a post which he held between 2005 and 2007. The handling of the disastrous flood in July 2005, as well as the serial bomb blasts in 2006, were handled by him.

In 2007, Patnaik was promoted as Addl. Director-General of Police and he held the post of Addl.Director-General of Police, (Traffic) Maharashtra State, from July 2007 to February 2011. It was during his tenure that the powers of the enforcement, which were taken away from the State Traffic Police on allegation of misuse, were restored.

In Feb 2011, Patnaik was appointed as the Commissioner of Police, Mumbai, a post which he held with distinction till August 2012.

Patnaik is a recipient of the Director-General of Police's Insignia for his signal contribution in the investigation of 1993 Bombay bombings.  He distinguished himself by his effective handling of the Bombay riots in his jurisdiction in 1992-93.

International representation and training

Patnaik has represented India in such International forums as Interpol, Lyons (France) and has participated in anti-money laundering workshops in Tokyo, Japan. He was a member of a high-level team to London in September 2011, where he interacted with Scotland Yard and a number of reputed professionals, so as to chart out a comprehensive CCTV cover project for Mumbai City. He also led a high-level team of Indian Police Officers to Los Angeles from 23 September 2011 to 3 October 2011, for extensive training with the FBI and the Los Angeles Police Department (LAPD) in counter-terrorism techniques. In 2013, he attended the Heads of Police deliberations at San Diego as India’s representative.

Personal life

Arup Patnaik is married to Vidhurita, a former Senior Executive with M/s Bennett Coleman and Company Limited The Times Group and has two children, Chirantan and Tanmay. The elder son is presently a Global Director with Commonwealth Development Corporation CDC Group and is based out of London. The younger son Tanmay studied law at Government Law College, Mumbai, and earned his LLM degree (Hons.) from Fordham University School of Law, New York. He is presently a Partner with the law firm Cyril Amarchand Mangaldas and is based in Mumbai.

Arup Patnaik is the Managing Trustee of the Konark Cancer Foundation. Along with Neurosurgeon, B. K. Misra and Cardiac surgeon, Ramakanta Panda, he set up the Konark Cancer Foundation for patients coming to the Tata Memorial Hospital for cancer treatment, providing them with financial and logistical support such as food and shelter for their attendants, providing other voluntary support, medications and prosthesis. Around 10,000 patients and their families have been benefited since its inception.

In popular culture 

In the 2004 action movie Aan: Men at Work, Bollywood superstar Akshay Kumar essayed the role of DCP "Hari Om Patnaik" which is a combination of his father's first name (Rajiv Hari Om Bhatia) and that of Patnaik (who holds him in high regard).
In the Bollywood movie Black Friday, actor Sharad Ponkshe essayed the role of Arup Patnaik. In the film's timeline (after 1993 Bomb Blasts), Arup Patnaik was the Deputy Commissioner of Police, Zone VII, and instrumental in the largest ever seizure of RDX, to the tune of 1500 kg at Mumbra in 1993.
Hussain Zaidi's 2002 book titled 'Black Friday' detailed the 1993 Mumbai bombings, an attack comprising 13 explosions that killed 250 people. Zaidi has dedicated an entire chapter on Patnaik and his handling of the situation. The book was adapted five years later into a film by Anurag Kashyap also titled Black Friday.

Mumbai Night Life - The 'Bar Buster'

During his stint as the Police Commissioner, Patnaik clamped down on various illegal establishments. The media had given Patnaik the title of "Bar Buster". Patnaik's juniors recalled how he made Bollywood actor and yesteryears' "Tarzan", Hemant Birje, and a few others do sit-ups in a bar at Andheri. This was quickly followed by raids on several bars in western Mumbai, which were the favorite hangouts of members of the underworld. Patnaik, during his stint as deputy commissioner of police in the western suburbs, was one of the key officers who took part in the 1991 Lokhandwala operation in which Dilip Buwa and Maya Dolas were killed.
A team, led by former additional commissioner AA Khan and Patnaik, soon raided Dagdi Chawl, gangster Arun Gawli's stronghold and nabbed key shooter Tanya Koli with a large cache of arms. Arup Patnaik had written to the state government that 14 city pubs, which enjoy the privilege of remaining open till 3 am by virtue of being inside 5-star hotels, should fall in with the regular 1:30 am deadline in order to avoid brawls. Patnaik had also appointed ACP Vasant Dhoble as head of Mumbai Police's Social Service Branch to lead the crackdown on these establishments within the letter of the law. Dhoble was to report directly to the Commissioner on all such matters.

Controversy

Patnaik was abruptly transferred from his post as Commissioner of Police in the aftermath of the Azad Maidan riots. The decision of the Maharashtra Government was highly criticized. Many felt he was a victim of political conspiracy  as the opposition led by Raj Thackeray asked for former Home Minister, the late R.R. Patil resignation. From security expert B Raman  to super cop Julio Ribeiro, everyone praised Patnaik’s handling of the explosive situation at Azad Maidan on 11 August. Patnaik had personally walked through the mob, refrained his men from opening fire on the Muslim youth and defused a restive and emotionally charged crowd of 50,000 in under 30 minutes. He was succeeded by Dr. Satyapal Singh.

References

Police Commissioners of Mumbai
Living people
1955 births